Arthur Vaughn Jr. (February 13, 1924 – January 17, 2007) was an American figure skater. He won the United States Figure Skating Championships in 1943. He was inducted into the U.S. Figure Skating Hall of Fame in 2001.

He was the brother of Jane Vaughn.

Results
(men's singles)

References

   
 Obituary

1924 births
Place of birth missing
Place of death missing
2007 deaths
American male single skaters